Bisha FC (formally known as Al-Nakheel), usually known simply as Bisha is a Saudi Arabian football (soccer) team in Bisha city playing at the Saudi Second Division.

Current squad 
As of 11 September 2021:

References

Bisha
Football clubs in Bisha